The Ministry of Land (Bhūmi mantraṇālaẏa) is the government ministry of Bangladesh responsible for formulating and implementing national policy on lands and other subjects which come under its purview.

Directorates
Land Appeal Board
Land Record and Survey Department
Land Reform Board
Land Administration Training Centre (LATC)

References

 
Land
Land management
Land management ministries